The 1227 papal election (19 March), was convoked after the death of Pope Honorius III on 18 March 1227 at Rome.

The cardinals present at Rome assembled in Septizodium on the next day after the death of Honorius III and decided to elect the new Pope by compromissum, meaning not by the whole Sacred College of Cardinals but by the committee of few of them, empowered by the rest to appoint the new Pontiff. The same procedure had been already used in the previous election. The committee numbered three cardinals, among whom were cardinal-bishops Ugolino di Segni of Ostia and Konrad von Urach of Porto (the name of the third one is not registered). Initially the committee elected its member Konrad von Urach with two votes out three, but he refused the tiara. Hereupon the rest of cardinals unanimously elected Ugolino di Segni (another committee member) on 19 March 1227. He reluctantly accepted the high honour, taking the name of Gregory IX.

The new Pope received the pallium in the Vatican Basilica on 21 March 1227, and on the same day was enthroned in the Lateran Basilica. On 11 April 1227, his relative Ottaviano Conti di Segni, archdeacon of the Sacred College, solemnly crowned him in the Basilica di S. Maria in Maggiore.

List of participants

Probably 15 out of 18 cardinals participated in the election:

Absentee cardinal

Probably three cardinals were absent:

Notes

Sources

 Konrad Eubel, Hierarchia Catholica Medii Aevi, volumen I, 1913
 F. Bourkle-Young: notes to the papal election of 1227
 Vatican history
 The Catholic Encyclopedia: Pope Gregory IX
 Werner Maleczek, Papst und Kardinalskolleg von 1191 bis 1216, Wien 1984
 Timo Bandhold, Die Wahl Papst Gregors IX., 2007, 
 Gaetano Moroni, Dizionario di erudizione storico-ecclesiastica da S. Pietro sino ai nostri giorni Vol. XXXII and vol. LXXXV, Tipografia Emiliana, Venezia, 1840 - 1861

1227
13th-century elections
1227
13th-century Catholicism
1227 in Europe